Elm-o-Sanat University Metro Station transcribed officially as Daneshgah-e Elm-o San'at Metro Station is a station in Tehran Metro Line 2. It is located in the junction of Resalat Expressway and Dordasht Street. It is near Iran University of Science and Technology. It is between Shahid Bagheri Metro Station and Sarsabz Metro Station.

This station has seven escalators and three elevators.

References

Tehran Metro stations